The Troubles at Frankfurt was a name given retrospectively to internal quarrels of the Marian exiles in Frankfurt am Main in the mid-1550s, involving also the Scottish reformer John Knox. Politically, Frankfurt was a Free Imperial City of the Holy Roman Empire.

Preliminary situation
In the summer of 1554, the English exile community in Frankfurt was sharing a church with the congregation of Valérand Poullain, and was led by the expatriate William Whittingham. They adopted liturgical practices, under some pressure from the local magistrates, that differed from what was laid down in the Second Prayer Book of Edward VI, of 1552. When Whittingham sent a declaration of unity to other exile groups, in August, Strasburg prepared to send one of more its leaders, to take matters in hand. The Frankfurt group responded by making known its intention to elect three ministers. T

According to A Brief Discourse, the major source for these events, John Knox was sent as a minister to Frankfurt from Geneva by John Calvin. He led the opposition to the "prayerbook faction", the supporters of the 1552 Prayer Book. Edmund Grindal came with a group from Strasburg, and had dealings with Knox. Grindal then wrote about the situation to Nicholas Ridley in England; who found the local compromise, in line with what happened for other exile groups, quite reasonable, but had some criticism of Knox's approach. Knox and Whittingham at this point pushed for a definition of essentials in the Prayer Book, causing Grindal to depart rather than be seen to negotiate.

Compromise attempts
The initial conflict centered on the order of the communion service. Knox would not use the Genevan order since it would offend others, but neither would he allow the use of the English prayerbook form. Thomas Lever led an attempt to construct a compromise order. The prayerbook faction was led by Richard Cox, who had left Strasburg to correct the situation in Frankfurt. However, others in Strasbourg and some who had moved from there to Frankfurt, opposed the prayerbook, so both congregations were divided from within. Some people may have remained out of the fight, and others, like Lever, changed sides over time. (In Knox's own account, Lever—who was his co-preacher—failed to support him and thereby exacerbated the division.)

Knox found supporters in Whittingham (Cox's former student), Richard Chambers, Anthony Gilby, Thomas Cole, Edward Sutton, Thomas Wood, William Williams, John Staunton, William Hammon, Michael Gill, and others. Knox and Whittingham wrote a Latin summary of the English prayerbook and sent it to Calvin for his opinion which was that it contained "many tolerable foolish things." Knox, Whittingham, Foxe, and Thomas Cole drafted what they thought would be an ideal order, but it was rejected by the prayerbook faction. It was later used at Geneva by the English congregation under Knox.

Adiaphora
In the process of the prayerbook dispute, Calvin weighed in when consulted to promote unity and compromise, although he agreed with those who took a low view of the prayerbook. As during the earlier Vestments controversy under Edward VI, the concept of adiaphora or "things indifferent" was once more a crux of debate, rather than helping to build consensus. The result was that adiaphora was eventually abandoned as an arguing point on each side.

Exacerbation of the dispute
A compromise order, really a version of the prayerbook service that retained much of it, was nearly accepted by 13 March 1555, just as a new group of English refugees, including John Jewel, was brought in by Cox. The newcomers strongly objected to the compromise liturgy, which omitted the litany with the congregations' spoken responses. Tensions increased since it was known that some of the new arrivals, like Jewel, had subscribed to Roman Catholic doctrines under Mary before they left England. Jewel preached a sermon in which he confessed his fault; but the more zealous exiles who were also prone to dislike Cox, a considerable pluralist, while the holding of multiple benefices was something "hot gospellers" under Edward VI had preached against. In May 1555 Knox preached on precisely this topic in Cox's presence, attacking the prayerbook and the scandal of pluralities. Knox nevertheless defied his own supporters in pleading that Cox's group be admitted as members of the congregation, which gave the prayerbook faction a majority.

Another settlement was in sight, when Knox's staunchest antagonists notified the local magistrates about Knox's An Admonition to Christians (1554). It disparaged Phillip II, Mary I, and Charles V, Holy Roman Emperor, whom Knox compared to Nero. Some of Knox's detractors felt that such radical language offended even sympathetic rulers and encouraged Roman Catholic persecution of Protestants in England and elsewhere. Notably John Hooper had just been burned at the stake in February, and his wife and children were among the Frankfurt exile community. The prayerbook faction, also availed itself of a divisive argument, that it was presumptuous to attempt to be liturgically purer than those who had accepted the prayerbook and were martyred back in England.

Departure of Knox
Knox was asked to leave Frankfurt, and he did so on March 26. Sympathisers led by William Whittingham (Thomas Cole and John Foxe among them) left for Basel and Geneva. Conflict, which had preceded Knox's presence, continued.

Historiography
The criticism Ridley had of Knox was suppressed in published versions of his letter during the 1560, by Miles Coverdale and John Foxe.

The extended conflicts are documented in a single printed source: the narrative and reprinted correspondence that comprise A Brieff discours off the troubles begonne at Franckford ... A.D. 1554. This book was printed anonymously in 1575 (though one extant copy is dated 1574) and reprinted in 1642, 1707–08, 1846, and 1907. It may have been issued in response to a sermon delivered at St. Paul's Cross on the subject of the Genevan form of church discipline then advocated by John Field.

Though it remains uncertain, the book's editor is commonly identified as William Whittingham. Patrick Collinson has made a case for Thomas Wood as the editor, and M. A. Simpson has questioned the assumption that there was a single author behind A Brief Discourse who was part of the debates it concerns. Much of its material must have come to its compiler(s) from other hands, the letters it contains vary in apparent authenticity, and the documentary sources behind it are no longer extant except, in adapted form, parts of John Knox's account of his time in Frankfurt.

Noting these things, Simpson conjectures that A Brief Discourse was the product of several editors, the last of whom he believes to have been John Field. The title page advertises A Brief Discourse as an explanation of the nature and origins of the conflicts in the Church of England then taking place and the emergence of separatism and Presbyterianism. It is partisan history.

Notes

History of the Church of England